The SEABA Under-16 Championship is an under-16 basketball championship in the International Basketball Federation's Southeast Asia Basketball Association, one of FIBA Asia's subzone. The event started in 2011 and is held bi-annually. The winners compete in the FIBA Asia Under-16 Championship, which started in 2009.

Summary

Medal table

Participating nations
Legend

 
 
 
 
 

For each tournament, the number of teams in each of the finals tournament are shown.

External links
 www.fibaasia.net

 
Under-16 basketball competitions between national teams
Basketball competitions in Asia between national teams
2011 establishments in Southeast Asia
Recurring sporting events established in 2011
Biennial sporting events